Alexander Malcolm may refer to:
 Alexander Malcolm (politician)
 Alexander Malcolm (writer on music)
 Alexander Malcolm (rugby union)